is a Japanese voice actor. He is managed by I'm Enterprise, along with several other significant Japanese voice actors.

Filmography
Bold denotes leading roles.

Television animation
2003
 Princess Tutu as Umazurakoomorinosuke
 Inuyasha as Young Miroku

2004
 Futakoi as Nozomu Futami

2005
 The Law of Ueki as Hayao Adachi
 Gallery Fake as Haruo Kikushima
 Damekko Dōbutsu as Uruno
 Pokémon Advance as Koroku
 Loveless as Loveless

2006
 Doraemon as Moteo Mote
 Demashitaa! Powerpuff Girls Z as Pepper Monster

2007
 ef: a tale of memories as Renji Asō
 Claymore as Raki
 Souten no Ken as Guang-Lin Pan (Young)
 You're Under Arrest: Full Throttle as Yano
 Toward the Terra as Jonah Matsuka

2008
 Ef: a tale of melodies. as Renji Asō
 Birdy the Mighty: Decode as Masayuki Hazawa
 Neo Angelique Abyss as Kai
 Hayate the Combat Butler as Male Classmate
 Persona -trinity soul- as Sōtarō Senō
 One Outs as Kurumizawa

2009
 Sōten Kōro as Yuan Shao (young)
 Birdy the Mighty Decode:02 as Masayuki Hazawa

2010
 Tantei Opera Milky Holmes as Mori Arty
 Chu-Bra!! as Kōta
 Hetalia: World Series as Hong Kong
 Stitch! ~Best Friends Forever~ as Heat
2011
 Hunter × Hunter (2011) as Sedokan
 Penguindrum as Souya

2012
 From the New World as Mamoru Itō (14 years old)
 Tantei Opera Milky Holmes Dai-Ni-Maku as Mori Arty
 Brave10 as Yuri Kamanosuke

2013
 Star Blazers 2199 as Tōru Hoshina
 Saint Seiya Omega as Rhea
 Hunter × Hunter (2011) as Cheetu
 Devils and Realist as Isaac Morton
 Mushibugyō as Yuri Kamanosuke

Drama CDs
 Aijin Incubus (Romio Aira)
 News Center no Koibito (Yuzuki Kojima)
 Yurigaoka Gakuen series 1: Heart mo Ace mo Boku no Mono (Jin Houjou)
 Yurigaoka Gakuen series 2: Kimidake no Prince ni Naritai (Jin Houjou)

Video games
 Mario (series) as Hammer Bro. (stand-in for Kazuki Ogawa)
 Dragon Ball Xenoverse as Time Patroller (Male 3)
 Touken Ranbu as Mouri Toshirou
 Tales of the Tempest as Caius Qualls
The Thousand Musketeers as Furusato

Tokusatsu
2017
 Uchu Sentai Kyuranger as Wunjet (ep. 36)

References

External links
Official blog  
Official agency profile 

1980 births
Living people
Japanese male video game actors
Japanese male voice actors
Male voice actors from Kanagawa Prefecture
21st-century Japanese male actors
I'm Enterprise voice actors